Route 197 is a short 19 km two-lane highway which cuts through the Appalachian Mountains in the municipality of Gaspé, Quebec, Canada. Its only function is to act as a shortcut to Route 132 which goes around the Forillon peninsula which makes up Forillon National Park. It starts at the junction of Route 132 in Rivière-au-Renard (part of the municipality of Gaspé) and ends again at the junction of Route 132 in Saint-Majorique, part of Gaspé as well.

Municipalities along Route 197
 Gaspé -  (Rivière-au-Renard / Rivière-Morris / Saint-Majorique )

Major intersections

See also
 List of Quebec provincial highways

References

External links 
 Interactive Provincial Route Map (Quebec Ministry of Transportation) 
 Route 197 on Google Maps

197
Roads in Gaspésie–Îles-de-la-Madeleine
Transport in Gaspé, Quebec